Darbari-ye Dam-e Abbas (also Romanized as Dārbarī-ye Dam-e ʿAbbās) is a village in Doshman Ziari Rural District, in the Central District of Kohgiluyeh County, Kohgiluyeh and Boyer-Ahmad Province, Iran. As of the 2006 census, it had a population of 36, comprising 7 families.

References 

Populated places in Kohgiluyeh County